Juan Belaieff (Ivan Timofeyevich Belyaev, 19 April 1875, Saint Petersburg, Russia — 19 January 1957, Asunción, Paraguay) was a Russian and Paraguayan cartographer and soldier, notable for his investigation and mapping of the Gran Chaco region and for his role in the Paraguayan army during the Chaco War.

Biography
Juan Belaieff was born as Ivan Belyaev in Saint Petersburg. His father was a military officer from a noble family. Belaieff signed up with the Russian Army in 1892, and graduated from the Michael Artillery School in 1893. He participated in World War I and was promoted to the rank of colonel in 1915, and of a major-general in 1917. He was seriously wounded in 1916 and spent several months in a hospital.

When the Russian Civil War started in 1918, Belaieff joined the Volunteer Army under the command of Pyotr Wrangel. On March 25, 1920, he was evacuated from Novorossiysk to Gallipoli, and from there moved to Bulgaria and eventually in 1923 to Buenos Aires. He was interested in creating a Russian colony in South America. After failing to find enough support of the idea in Argentina, he moved in 1924 to Paraguay, where he was accepted to military service, and managed to relax the conditions for immigration of the former white movement officers who were accepted to Paraguayan military service as well. He was detached to the General Staff and founded the Engineering Department there, where he employed 12 Russian officers who arrived to Paraguay after him. He was also appointed a professor at the Military Academy. In Paraguay, he was known as Juan Belaieff.

In October 1924, Belaieff was sent on a mission to the Gran Chaco, a vast and sparsely populated area in western Paraguay, which needed to be explored and mapped. He was also commissioned to demarcate the boundaries with Brazil and Bolivia. In total, Beliaeff led 13 expeditions to the Gran Chaco, which he mapped, and he also established good relations with the local indigenous Maká people population who held him in high esteem. The Maká were hired as his guides and porters and Belaieff became interested in their language and culture,  performing anthropological and ethnographic studies. In March 1931, he became the first white person to reach Lake Pitiantuta, the largest lake of the Gran Chaco region.

Since 1930, when the Chaco War was approaching, Belaieff was patrolling the Gran Chaco and suggesting locations for forts (including the one by Lake Pitiantuta). Although he did not participate in combat, the Paraguayan army heavily relied on his knowledge of the area. In 1932, he was promoted to the rank of a Division General (honoris causa), and since 1933, he was a councellor of the President.

Juan Belaieff died in Asuncion on January 19, 1957. He belonged to the Russian Orthodox Church. According to his will, after the memorial service his body was transported to the west bank of the Paraguay river, where the Gran Chaco region begins, and buried in a mausoleum inside a Maká reservation. After his death, Belaieff became a messianic deity for the Maká people.

References 

1875 births
1957 deaths
Military personnel from Saint Petersburg
People from Sankt-Peterburgsky Uyezd
Russian nobility
Cartographers from the Russian Empire
19th-century military personnel from the Russian Empire
White Russian emigrants to Argentina
Argentine emigrants to Paraguay
Naturalized citizens of Paraguay
Paraguayan people of Russian descent
Paraguayan scientists
Imperial Russian Army generals
Paraguayan generals
Russian military personnel of World War I
Paraguayan military personnel of the Chaco War